Ebru Şallı (born 15 January 1977) is a television personality, model, author, actress, and former beauty pageant titleholder from Turkey.

Biography
Ebru Şallı was born in Istanbul in 1977. She graduated from Nişantaşı Girls High School a year after she won the Queen of Turkey beauty pageant in 1995. Following the beauty pageant, she starred in several television series. Up to 2014, Ebru Şallı has created 7 instructional DVDs for fitness and pilates, the first of which sold over 55,000 units. She also authored numerous pieces on homemaking and pilates, and made dozens of television appearances. Şallı released four books under the Alfa publishing imprint, Hamilelikte Güzel ve Sağlıklı Kalmak (2008), Besleyici ve Lezzetli Çocuk Yemekleri: Ebru Şallı (2009), Ebru'nun Doğal Güzellik Sırları (2009), and Ebru'nun Mutfağından (2011). She launched her online shopping website, Ebru Şallı Store, in 2012.

Conviction of drug abuse
On 16 June 1999, Şallı was convicted of drug abuse, after she was accused of using cocaine. She spent fifteen days at the Bakırköy Women's Prison in Istanbul.

DVDs
 Ebru Şallı ile Pilates
 Ebru Şallı ile Pilates 2
 Ebru Şallı ile Hamilelikte Pilates
 Selülit Savar
 Ebru Şallı ile 21 Günde Yağlarınızdan Kurtulun
 Ebru Şallı ile Karınsavar
 Yogalates (2014)

Filmography

Publications
 Hamilelikte Sağlıklı ve Güzel Kalmak (2005)
 Ebru Şallı'dan Çocuklar için Besleyici Eğlenceli Lezzetler (2007)
 Ebru'nun Doğal Güzellik Sırları (2009)
 Ebru'nun Mutfağından (2011)
 Besleyici ve Lezzetli Çocuk Yemekleri (2012)
 Ebru Şallı ile Pilates (2014)

References

External links
 
 Ebru Şallı Store
 

Living people
1977 births
Models from Istanbul
Turkish female models
Turkish television presenters
Turkish television actresses
Turkish women in business
Businesspeople from Istanbul
Writers from Istanbul
Turkish people convicted of drug offenses
Turkish prisoners and detainees
Inmates of Bakırköy Prison for Women
Turkish women television presenters
Television people from Istanbul